Georgina Megan Brayshaw (born 14 October 1993) is a British rower. She won a gold medal in the quadruple sculls at the 2022 European Rowing Championships.

References

External links

1993 births
Living people
British female rowers
European Rowing Championships medalists
World Rowing Championships medalists for Great Britain
21st-century British women